Raymond Joseph "Rem" Murray (born October 9, 1972) is a Canadian former professional ice hockey left winger. Murray was selected in the sixth round, 135th overall in the 1992 NHL Entry Draft by the Los Angeles Kings, and he played in the National Hockey League (NHL) with the Edmonton Oilers, New York Rangers and Nashville Predators before playing in Europe to finish his career.

Playing career
Murray spent four years at Michigan State where he was a CCHA First Team All-Rookie in 1992 and a CCHA Second Team All-Star in 1995. Unsigned from the Kings, in the summer of 1995, the Edmonton Oilers signed Murray as a free agent and assigned him to their American Hockey League affiliate in Cape Breton where he led the team in scoring as a rookie and finished 14th in AHL scoring with 90 points.

Following a successful rookie season in Cape Breton, Murray joined the Oilers for the 1996–97 season. He spent 6 seasons in Edmonton. This included the 1998–99 campaign where he set career highs for goals (21) and points (39). He was traded to the New York Rangers in 2002. Murray played in 85 games during the 2002–03 season, although the NHL regular season has each team play only 82 regular season games. Murray was traded from the Rangers to the Nashville Predators mid-season.

In 2004, while playing for the Predators, Murray was diagnosed with a rare neck condition, (a form of dystonia) which tentatively forced him to retire in 2005. However, after failing a tryout with the Detroit Red Wings, Murray played the 2005–06 season with the Houston Aeros of the AHL, tallying 35 points in 54 games, good enough for Murray's former team, the Edmonton Oilers, to sign him to a contract in March 2006, in time for him to take part in their run to the Stanley Cup Finals.

After two successful seasons in the Finnish SM-liiga (2007, 2008) for IFK Helsinki, Murray signed for HC Innsbruck in the Austrian Hockey League. On July 11, 2009, he signed a contract with Pustertal-Val Pusteria Wolves in the Serie A.

Murray returned to Innsbruck as assistant captain the following season. After two seasons in the 2nd Austrian Hockey League he helped Innsbruck return to the EBEL. Upon announcing his retirement at the conclusion of the season, Murray's number 17 jersey was retired by Innsbruck at the team's season opener in the 2012–13 campaign.

Murray wore three different numbers while playing with the Edmonton Oilers: #17 (which he had to give up when the Oilers retired Jari Kurri's jersey), #16 (which he asked former captain Kelly Buchberger if he could wear), and #22 (which he wore on his second stint with the Oilers because #16 was already taken by Jarret Stoll).

Murray now has four kids. He is a 2016 Michigan Amateur Hockey Association 30+ Recreational Division State Champion.

Career statistics

Regular season and playoffs

International

Championships
2016 Michigan Amateur Hockey Association 30+ Recreational Division State Champions

Awards and honours

References

External links

1972 births
Living people
Canadian ice hockey left wingers
Cape Breton Oilers players
Edmonton Oilers players
HIFK (ice hockey) players
HC Pustertal Wölfe players
HC TWK Innsbruck players
Houston Aeros (1994–2013) players
Sportspeople from Stratford, Ontario
Los Angeles Kings draft picks
Michigan State Spartans men's ice hockey players
Nashville Predators players
New York Rangers players
Ice hockey people from Ontario
Canadian expatriate ice hockey players in Austria
Canadian expatriate ice hockey players in Italy
Canadian expatriate ice hockey players in Finland